Early general elections were held in Sweden on 1 June 1958, after the defeat of the Social Democratic government's proposals for a new pensions system in a parliamentary vote. The Social Democrats remained the largest party, winning 111 of the 231 seats in the Andra kammaren of the Riksdag, and Tage Erlander's third government was returned to power. In accordance with the law, the new Chamber was elected only to complete the previous Chamber's term, which was due to end in 1960.

Results

References

General elections in Sweden
Sweden
General election
Sweden